Victor Christian William Cavendish, 9th Duke of Devonshire  (31 May 18686 May 1938), known as Victor Cavendish until 1908, was a British peer and politician who served as Governor General of Canada.

A member of the Cavendish family, he was educated at Eton College and the University of Cambridge. After the death of his father in 1891, he entered politics, winning his father's constituency unopposed. He held that seat until he inherited his uncle's dukedom in 1908. Thereafter, he took his place in the House of Lords, while, for a period at the same time, acting as mayor of Eastbourne and Chesterfield. He held various government posts both prior to and after his rise to the peerage. In 1916 he was appointed governor general of Canada by King George V, on the recommendation of Prime Minister H. H. Asquith, to replace Prince Arthur, Duke of Connaught and Strathearn, as viceroy. He occupied that post until succeeded by Lord Byng of Vimy in 1921. The appointment was initially controversial but, by the time of his return to England, the Duke had earned praise for the way in which he carried out his official duties.

Following his tenure as governor general, he returned to political and diplomatic life, serving as Secretary of State for the Colonies between 1922 and 1924, before retiring to his estate in Derbyshire, where he died on 6 May 1938. He was the last Duke to ever hold a cabinet post.

Early life, education and military career
Cavendish was born in the Marylebone area of London, England, the eldest son of Lord Edward Cavendish, himself the third son of the 7th Duke of Devonshire, and Emma Lascelles, both the daughter of William Lascelles and Lord Edward's cousin. Cavendish's younger brother was Lord Richard Cavendish and his uncles were Spencer Cavendish, Marquess of Hartington (later the eighth Duke of Devonshire) and Lord Frederick Cavendish.

Cavendish was educated at Eton College before being admitted to Trinity College, Cambridge, on 30 May 1887, where he served as secretary of the Pitt Club. During his years at Cambridge, Cavendish was initiated into Isaac Newton University Lodge and served part-time with the Derbyshire Yeomanry, into which he was commissioned as a second lieutenant in 1890. He was promoted major in September 1901 and retired from the Yeomanry in 1911.

Marriage and children
On 30 July 1892, Cavendish married Lady Evelyn Petty-FitzMaurice, the elder daughter of Henry Petty-Fitzmaurice, 5th Marquess of Lansdowne, Viceroy of India and quondam Governor General of Canada. The couple had seven children:

 Edward William Spencer Cavendish, 10th Duke of Devonshire (8 May 1895 - 26 November 1950)
 Lady Maud Louisa Emma Cavendish (20 April 1896 - 30 March 1975), married 1) in 1917 Angus Alexander Mackintosh, who was killed in action 1918.  2) in 1923 Brigadier George Evan Michael Baillie, killed on active service 1941.
 Lady Blanche Katharine Cavendish (2 February 1898 - 1987) 
 Lady Dorothy Evelyn Cavendish (28 July 1900 - 21 May 1966), wife of Harold Macmillan, later Prime Minister of the United Kingdom and Earl of Stockton
 Lady Rachel Cavendish (22 January 1902 - 2 October 1977), later Viscountess Stuart of Findhorn
 Lord Charles Arthur Francis Cavendish (29 August 1905 - 23 March 1944) 
 Lady Anne Cavendish (20 August 1909 - 1981) Countess of Sandwich, wife of Henry Hunloke, later of Christopher Holland-Martin, and of Victor Montagu, all MPs (the last also 10th Earl of Sandwich)

Through his children's eventual marriages, Cavendish became the father-in-law of Henry Philip Hunloke, Christopher Holland-Martin, James Stuart, 1st Viscount Stuart of Findhorn, Harold Macmillan, Adele Astaire and Victor Montagu, 10th Earl of Sandwich.

Political career
In May 1891, shortly before Cavendish graduated from Cambridge, his father, who sat as the Member of Parliament for West Derbyshire, died and Cavendish entered the race for that parliamentary seat and won it, thus becoming the youngest member of the British House of Commons at the time.

For seventeen years Cavendish held parliamentary positions. Between 1900 and 1903, he served as Treasurer of the Household, from 1903 to 1905 as Financial Secretary to the Treasury, and on 11 December 1905 he was sworn of the Privy Council. In 1907, he was appointed a deputy lieutenant of Derbyshire and, from 1908, acted as Honorary Colonel of the 5th (Territorial Army) Battalion of the Sherwood Foresters.

When he succeeded to his uncle's dukedom on 24 March 1908, Devonshire, as he was thereafter known, was disqualified from holding his seat in the Commons, as he now held a place in the House of Lords. The same year, Devonshire was appointed as Lord Lieutenant of Derbyshire and the year following was made Chancellor of the University of Leeds. He was then elected to two mayoral offices: first to that of Eastbourne, between 1909 and 1910, and then Chesterfield, from 1911 to 1912. In the House of Lords, Devonshire served as Conservative Chief Whip from 1911 and, after the Conservatives joined the government during the First World War, as joint Government Chief Whip in the upper chamber, holding office as Civil Lord of the Admiralty. Following the war, he became Honorary Colonel and Commandant of the Derbyshire Volunteer Regiment of the Volunteer Training Corps in 1918.

Governor General of Canada

It was announced on 8 August 1916 that King George V had, by commission under the royal sign-manual and signet, approved the recommendation of his British prime minister, H. H. Asquith, to appoint Devonshire as his representative in Canada. The appointment caused political problems, as Canadian prime minister Robert Borden had not been consulted on the matter, contrary to practice that had been well established by that time. Borden thus felt insulted, which led to considerable difficulties at the beginning of Devonshire's tenure, officially beginning after he was sworn in on 11 November 1916 during a ceremony held in Halifax.

In that era, there was social unrest in the country. The women's suffrage movement gaining momentum in Canada, calls were coming out of the prairies for socialist changes to the governmental system and war continued to rage around the world. Canada was providing troops and supplies, and shortly after his installation, acting on the advice of Borden, Devonshire introduced conscription, a decision that was particularly divisive between French and English Canadians and sparked the Conscription Crisis of 1917. The same year, the Governor General also travelled to Nova Scotia to survey the damage caused by the Halifax Explosion on 6 December. There, he met with survivors and addressed the women of the Voluntary Aid Detachment.

The Canadian victory in 1917 at the Battle of Vimy Ridge, however, helped fuel Canadian pride and nationalism at home, and the Governor General, while conscious of his role's remaining connection to the British government, used the victory positively and publicly encourage to reconciliation between Canada's two main linguistic groups. At all times, Devonshire was careful to consult with his prime minister and the leaders of His Majesty's Loyal Opposition in Canada on matters related to conscription and the war effort.

Devonshire took an active interest in the lives of Canadians and conducted various tours of the country to meet with them. As a landowner himself, the Governor General was particularly focused on the development of farming in Canada and during his travels, at agricultural and horticultural fairs, shows, and sugaring-off parties in the Gatineau, he discussed agricultural issues with farmers and other people in the industry. His speeches often referred to Canada's potential to lead the world in agricultural research and development, and one of his major projects as viceroy was establishing experimental farms, including the Crown's central one in Ottawa. At the same time, Devonshire acted as a patron of the arts
When not on tour or residing at La Citadelle, the viceregal residence in Quebec City at which the Duke enjoyed spending time, he frequently visited the National Gallery and hosted theatrical performances at Rideau Hall. There, on the grounds of the royal residence, during the winters, the Devonshires also hosted tobogganing and skating parties, as well as hockey matches. Officially, in 1918 Devonshire travelled to the United States to meet President Woodrow Wilson informally, and the following year, he was host to Prince Edward, Prince of Wales, during his first tour of Canada.

By the end of his tenure as governor general, Devonshire had overcome all of the initial suspicions that had surrounded his appointment, and both men who served as his Canadian prime minister, Borden and Arthur Meighen, came to view him as a personal friend of them and also of Canada. The former said of Devonshire: "No Governor General has come with a more comprehensive grasp of public questions as they touch not only this country and the United Kingdom, but the whole Empire". The Duke left as a mark of his time in Canada the Devonshire Cup, for the annual golf competition of the Canadian Seniors Golf Association, and the Duke of Devonshire Trophy, for the Ottawa Horticultural Society. While in Canada, Devonshire's two aides-de-camp married his daughters.

Later career

On returning to England, Devonshire worked at the League of Nations before serving from 1922 to 1924 as Secretary of State for the Colonies (with a seat in the Cabinet, while headed by Prime Ministers Bonar Law and Stanley Baldwin). There, he opposed the views of Lord Delemere, the leading White settler in Kenya, who had helped found the Happy Valley set and campaigned for self-government by White settlers. Devonshire advocated protecting the interests of the Africans. The Devonshire White Paper of 1923, which he authored, was cited as a reason why Kenya did not develop as a white minority rule, similar to the model of the Union of South Africa and Southern Rhodesia.

In 1922, he was appointed by King George V to the committee that was charged with looking into how honours were to be bestowed in the United Kingdom. From 1933 until his death he was Honorary Colonel of the 24 (Derbyshire Yeomanry) Armoured Car Company, Royal Tank Regiment, in the Territorial Army. He simultaneously continued to run his agricultural land holdings, especially around Chatsworth House, where he died in May 1938.

Honours

Appointments
  11 December 19056 May 1938: Member of His Majesty's Most Honourable Privy Council (PC)
  19 August 19126 May 1938: Knight Grand Cross of the Royal Victorian Order (GCVO)
  28 July 19166 May 1938: Knight Grand Cross of the Most Distinguished Order of Saint Michael and Saint George (GCMG)
  18 August 191627 November 1917: Knight of Grace of the Order of St John of Jerusalem (KGStJ)
 27 November 19176 May 1938: Knight of Justice of the Order of St John of Jerusalem (KJStJ)
  11 November 19162 August 1921: Chief Scout for Canada
  11 November 19166 May 1938: Honorary Member of the Royal Military College of Canada Club
  1 January 19166 May 1938: Knight Companion of the Most Noble Order of the Garter (KG)

Medals
  1902: King Edward VII Coronation Medal
  1911: King George V Coronation Medal
  1935: King George V Silver Jubilee Medal
  1937: King George VI Coronation Medal
  1923: Territorial Decoration

Honorary military appointments
  11 November 19162 August 1921: Colonel of the Governor General's Horse Guards
  11 November 19162 August 1921: Colonel of the Governor General's Foot Guards
  11 November 19162 August 1921: Colonel of the Canadian Grenadier Guards

Honorary degrees
  1917: University of Alberta, Doctor of Laws (LLD)

Honorific eponyms
Awards
 : Devonshire Cup
 : Duke of Devonshire Trophy

Geographic locations

Ottawa, Ontario Devonshire Community Public School

 : Devonshire Crescent, Imperial

See also 

 Bell Telephone Memorial
 Duke of Devonshire

References

External links 

 
Website of the Governor General of Canada entry for Duke of Devonshire

1868 births
1938 deaths
Secretaries of State for the Colonies
Deputy Lieutenants of Derbyshire
Deputy Lieutenants of Lancashire
109
04
English justices of the peace
Cavendish, Victor
Governors General of Canada
Knights of the Garter
Knights Grand Cross of the Royal Victorian Order
Knights Grand Cross of the Order of St Michael and St George
Lord-Lieutenants of Derbyshire
Lords of the Admiralty
Cavendish, Victor
Liberal Unionist Party peers
Alumni of Trinity College, Cambridge
Cavendish, Victor
Cavendish, Victor
Cavendish, Victor
Cavendish, Victor
Cavendish, Victor
Cavendish, Victor
Devonshire, D9
Victor Cavendish, 9th Duke of Devonshire
Treasurers of the Household
Directors of the Furness Railway
Presidents of the Marylebone Cricket Club
Chief Scouts of Canada
Derbyshire Yeomanry officers
20th-century British landowners
Mayors of Chesterfield
Members of the Privy Council of the United Kingdom
British Freemasons
Members of Isaac Newton University Lodge
People educated at Eton College
People associated with the University of Leeds